The Stu Sells Oakville Tankard (also known as the OCT Championships) is an annual bonspiel on the men's and women's Ontario Curling Tour. Except for in 2020, the event has been held at the Oakville Curling Club in Oakville, Ontario. The event was formerly just on the Ontario Curling Tour, but it was promoted as a World Curling Tour event in 2013 when Stu Sells became the sponsor.

As of 2019, the purse for the event is $36,000 for both the men's and the women's events. A Tier 2 men's event was added in 2016 (but was discontinued), with a total purse of $16,000.

In 2020, the event was held at the KW Granite Club in Waterloo, Ontario, due to the COVID-19 pandemic delaying the opening of the Oakville Curling Club. That year, the men's event was halted before the playoffs, as one player was notified through a COVID Alert tracing app that he had come in contact with someone who had the virus.  The women's playoff was held, however, as the men's and women's teams did not play at the same time.

Past champions

Men

Tier 1

Tier 2

Women

External links

References

Ontario Curling Tour events
World Curling Tour events
Women's World Curling Tour events
Oakville, Ontario